Hougang Bus Depot is an SBS Transit West District bus depot located in Hougang, Singapore. As of November 2014, the total fleet is 600 buses.

Hougang Bus Depot started operations in 1984 when the north-east which is Hougang and Serangoon was developed and previously, all operations had been on Ang Mo Kio Bus Depot and Bedok Bus Depot respectively.

External links
 

Bus garages
Bus stations in Singapore
1983 establishments in Singapore